Cline Hill Summit is an Oregon mountain pass, over the Coast Range. It has also been classed as a gap, and, is in Lincoln County.

It is traversed by US Route 20.

In the area of Cline Hill

The cities of

 Summit       
 Blodgett     
 Kings Valley 
 Toledo         
 Philomath    
 Siletz       
 Alsea        
 Corvallis    
 Newport      

are all near, to Cline Hill.

References

External links and references

 One link, on Cline Hill
 Another link

Mountain passes of Oregon
Transportation in Lincoln County, Oregon